The Cottbus Zoo is a zoo in the town Cottbus in the Brandenburg region of Germany.
The park includes a lot of trees, growing along the river Spree.
The zoo breeds over 70 species of waterfowl, and its symbol is the red-breasted goose.

History 
The zoo's first director, Erhard Frommhold (1956–1963), developed the park into a real Zoological park, and the zoo had status as a Zoo in 1960.

1966 the director was followed by Kunz Rauschert (1963–1966), followed by Klaus Jacob (1966–2002).

1969 was the year of arrival of the first elephant, Sundali.

2002 director Klaus Jacob retired and was replaced by Dr. Jens Kämmerling.

Pictures

See also 
 List of zoos in Germany

References

External links
 The elephant Database: All elephants at Cottbus Zoo in Germany

 
  at Zoo-Infos.de (in English)

Zoos in Germany
Zoos established in 1954
Tourist attractions in Cottbus
Buildings and structures in Cottbus